Jelle de Lange (born 30 January 1998) is a Dutch former professional footballer who played as a centre back.

Club career

De Lange is a youth exponent from FC Utrecht. He made his Eredivisie debut on 17 May 2015 against Vitesse. In June 2017, de Lange ended his career as a professional footballer, citing a loss of pleasure in playing football. Initially wanting to quit football completely, he later joined his youth club AFC competing in the Hoofdklasse. He played there for a season, and then decided to play with friends in the fifth team of AFC, playing in the Derde Klasse.

References

1998 births
Living people
Dutch footballers
Eredivisie players
FC Utrecht players
Association football defenders
Netherlands youth international footballers
Footballers from Amsterdam
Jong FC Utrecht players
Amsterdamsche FC players
Eerste Divisie players
Vierde Divisie players